An outdoor bust of Senator Henry M. Jackson is installed on the University of Washington campus in Seattle, Washington's University District, in the United States. It is located outside Thomson Hall, home to the Henry M. Jackson School of International Studies, and sits opposite a bust of Norwegian composer Edvard Grieg.

See also

 Campus of the University of Washington

References

Busts in Washington (state)
Monuments and memorials in Seattle
Outdoor sculptures in Seattle
Sculptures of men in Washington (state)
University of Washington campus